Zaynaba Kazbekovna Dayibekova (born 19 November 2002) is an Uzbekistani fencer. She competed in the women's sabre event at the 2020 Summer Olympics in Tokyo, Japan.

She qualified for the 2020 Summer Olympics at the Asia & Oceania qualification tournament held in Tashkent, Uzbekistan.

References

External links 
 

Living people
2002 births
Uzbekistani female sabre fencers
Fencers at the 2020 Summer Olympics
Olympic fencers of Uzbekistan
People from Nukus
World Cadets and Juniors Fencing Championships medalists
Islamic Solidarity Games medalists in fencing
Islamic Solidarity Games competitors for Uzbekistan
21st-century Uzbekistani women